Čreta is a settlement in the Municipality of Hoče–Slivnica in northeastern Slovenia. It lies in the eastern foothills of the Pohorje Hills south of Maribor. The area is part of the traditional region of Styria. The municipality is now included in the Drava Statistical Region.

An Iron Age and Roman-period hill fort with its associated burial ground with around 35 burial mounds have been identified near the settlement.

References

External links

Čreta on Geopedia

Populated places in the Municipality of Hoče-Slivnica